Brian Clifford Walton (born December 18, 1965) is a Canadian cycling coach and former professional road and track cyclist. His racing career spanned 18 years, racing professionally for North American pro teams 7-Eleven, Motorola, and Saturn. He represented Canada at the Pan American Games, Commonwealth Games, and the Olympic Games in 1988, 1996 and 2000. He won a silver medal in the points race at the 1996 Summer Olympics in Atlanta, Georgia. Walton was inducted into the BC Sports Hall of Fame in 2006.

Walton is a former partner at Cadence Performance Cycling Center in Philadelphia. He now is the president of Walton Endurance.

Major results

Road

1988
 1st  Road race, National Road Championships
 1st Gastown Grand Prix
1989
 1st Overall Milk Race
1st Stage 9b
 6th Overall Tour of Ireland
1990
 1st Stage 5b (ITT) Tour of the Basque Country
 1st Stage 4 International Cycling Classic
 2nd Cholet-Pays de Loire
 3rd GP Eddy Merckx
 8th Overall Tour Méditerranéen
1991
 1st Overall Bayern Rundfahrt
1st Prologue, Stages 2b & 4
 1st Stage 4 International Cycling Classic
1992
 7th GP Eddy Merckx
1993
 2nd Overall Herald Sun Tour
1st Stage 13
1994
 1st Tour de White Rock
 3rd Overall Cascade Classic
 3rd Philadelphia International Championship
1995
 1st  Road race, Pan American Games
 1st Tour de White Rock
 3rd Overall Valley of the Sun Stage Race
1st Stage 2
 3rd Overall West Virginia Classic
 4th Philadelphia International Championship
1996
 5th Overall Herald Sun Tour
 6th Overall Tour of China
1997
 1st Stage 8 Tour de Langkawi
 2nd Time trial, National Road Championships
 2nd Overall Fitchburg Longsjo Classic
 6th Overall Circuit des Mines
1st Stage 2
 9th Overall Peace Race
1998
 1st Fyen Rundt
 National Road Championships
2nd Road race
2nd Time trial
 3rd Overall Fitchburg Longsjo Classic
1st Prologue
 6th Road race, Commonwealth Games
 9th Overall Tour of Japan
1999
 1st  Road race, Pan American Games
 Tour of Japan
1st Points classification
1st Stage 6
 2nd Time trial, National Road Championships
 2nd Philadelphia International Championship
 7th Overall Tour de Beauce
2000
 3rd Road race, National Road Championships
 5th First Union Wilmington Classic
 6th Overall Tour de Slovénie

Track

1983
 1st  Points race, National Championships
1984
 1st  Points race, National Championships
1994
 3rd  Scratch, Commonwealth Games
1995
 Pan American Games
1st  Points race
3rd  Individual pursuit
1996
 2nd  Points race, Summer Olympics
1997
 1st Points race, Trexlertown, UCI World Cup
1998
 1st Points race, Victoria, UCI World Cup
1999
 1st Points race, Manchester, UCI World Cup

References

External links

 Canadian Olympic Committee
 
 Cadence Cycling
 2000 Summer Olympics Bio

1965 births
Living people
Canadian male cyclists
Cyclists at the 1988 Summer Olympics
Cyclists at the 1996 Summer Olympics
Cyclists at the 1995 Pan American Games
Cyclists at the 1999 Pan American Games
Cyclists at the 2000 Summer Olympics
Olympic cyclists of Canada
Olympic silver medalists for Canada
Sportspeople from Ottawa
Olympic medalists in cycling
Medalists at the 1996 Summer Olympics
Commonwealth Games medallists in cycling
Commonwealth Games bronze medallists for Canada
Pan American Games medalists in cycling
Pan American Games gold medalists for Canada
Cyclists at the 1994 Commonwealth Games
Medalists at the 1995 Pan American Games
Medallists at the 1994 Commonwealth Games